is a Japanese football player for Oita Trinita.

Career
After attending Ryutsu Keizai University, Arai joined Shimizu S-Pulse in January 2018.

Club statistics
Updated to 1 December 2022.

Honours

Individual
 Japanese college best GK (2017)

References

External links

Profile at J. League
Profile at Kanazawa
Profile at Shimizu
Profile at Akita

1995 births
Living people
Ryutsu Keizai University alumni
Association football people from Saitama Prefecture
Japanese footballers
J2 League players
Shimizu S-Pulse players
Zweigen Kanazawa players
Blaublitz Akita players
Oita Trinita players
Association football goalkeepers